Gonotropis is a genus of fungus weevils in the family of beetles known as Anthribidae. There are about five described species in Gonotropis.

Species
These five species belong to the genus Gonotropis:
 Gonotropis crassicornis Oda, 1979 c
 Gonotropis dorsalis (Thunberg, 1796) c g b
 Gonotropis gibbosa Leconte, 1876 c g
 Gonotropis gibbosus LeConte, 1876 i
 Gonotropis murakamii Oda, 1979 c
Data sources: i = ITIS, c = Catalogue of Life, g = GBIF, b = Bugguide.net

References

Further reading

External links

 

Anthribidae